Dennis Hollard (23 August 1924 – 10 September 2003) was a South African cricketer. He played in three first-class matches for Border in 1947/48.

See also
 List of Border representative cricketers

References

External links
 

1924 births
2003 deaths
South African cricketers
Border cricketers
People from Westerham